French submarine Alose (Q33) (“Shad”) is a  Naïade-class submarine of the Romazotti type. She was  built for the French Navy at the beginning of the 20th century. Alose remained in service until just prior to the outbreak of World War I.

Design and construction
Alose was ordered by the French Navy under its 1900 building programme, one of a class of twenty. She was designed by Gaston Romazotti, an early French submarine engineer. Alose was built at the Toulon Naval Dockyard and was launched on 12 October 1904. She was single-hulled, with dual propulsion, and constructed of Roma-bronze, a copper alloy of Romazotti's devising. 
Alose was named for the Shad, an open-water fish of the herring family.

Service history
Alose entered service in July 1907, and was employed on coastal duties, guarding ports and harbours. She was involved in several accidents, though none resulted in serious damage. In November 1906 she was struck by the steamer Mouette in Toulon Roads . In November 1910 she collided with sister ship Bonite, damaging both.

Fate
Alose was stricken in May 1914 and was used as a target ship, being sunk off Fréjus in March 1918.

In 1975 the wreck was discovered by French divers off Lion rock, near Saint-Raphaël, Var. She was raised and restored as a museum ship in May 1976,  and now stands outside the offices of COMEX in Marseilles.

Notes

References
 Gardiner R, Gray R: Conway’s All the World’s Fighting Ships 1906-1921 (1985)

External links

Naïade-class submarine
1904 ships
Ships built in France
Ships sunk as targets
Museum ships in France